The 2008 Formula V6 Asia season took place in four Asian countries. The season started on May 16–18 in Sepang and ended on November 21–23 in Shanghai.

Drivers and teams

Race calendar

Earl Bamber and Armaan Ebrahim did not participate to the last venue due to their commitment in the Malaysian round in A1 Grand Prix.

Full Series Results
Points are awarded in both races as following: 15, 12, 10, 8, 6, 5, 4, 3, 2 for 9th and 1 bonus points for pole position in the first of the two venue races but only awarded to drivers, not for teams. Only the drivers that achieve races are awarded by points. The team standing is obtained with the best two drivers of each team at each race

Drivers

Teams

References

External links
 Formula Asia V6 by Renault official website

Formula V6 Asia season 2008
Formula V6 Asia seasons
2008 in Asian sport
V6 Asia